Polar Bears International (PBI) is a non-profit polar bear conservation organization. Their research, education, and action programs address the issues that are endangering polar bears. The organization also studies polar bears and monitors their activity data which helped lead to the animals being listed as a threatened species. While Churchill, Canada, serves as an important hub for PBI scientists and educators, the organization's work on behalf of polar bears spans the Arctic including Svalbard, Russia, and Alaska. 

PBI's Chief Scientist is Steven Amstrup, winner of the 2012 Indianapolis Prize.

Description
Churchill, Manitoba, is known throughout the world as the place where hundreds of polar bears gather each fall to wait for the sea ice to return to Hudson Bay. The town is also a hub for Polar Bears International and several of PBI's programs including Tundra Connections webcasts – free, live webcasts provided by polar bear and climate scientists and geared towards students, families and professionals, Polar Bear Cams with Explore.org, and Climate Alliance training take place.  

Polar bears are marine mammals, adapted to life on frozen or partly-frozen ocean. They hunt seals from the surface of the sea ice, and also rely on the ice to travel. Sea ice is as important to the Arctic as the soil is to the forest – it supports the entire Arctic food chain. Arctic sea ice is melting at a rate of 13.1% to 13.4% per decade. The 13 lowest Arctic sea ice extents on record have all occurred in the last 13 years.

In partnership with Google, polar bear habitats in Churchill were added to Google Maps in February 2014. PBI has worked with the Association of Zoos and Aquariums to create education programs regarding polar bear conservation. In November 2019, PBI unveiled the Polar Bears International House, a new center in Churchill.

Research
Denned polar bears are invisible under the snow; therefore, winter-time petroleum exploration and development activities in northern Alaska have potential to disturb maternal polar bears and their cubs. Previous research determined forward-looking infrared (FLIR) imagery could detect many polar bear maternal dens under the snow, but also identified limitations of FLIR imagery. This study evaluated the efficacy of FLIR-surveys conducted by oil-field operators from 2004 to 2016.

The study "The ecological and behavioral significance of short-term food caching in polar bears (Ursus maritimus)" observed wild polar bears caching of food and has led to the conclusion that such behavior does not occur or is negligible in this species per observations of short-term hoarding by polar bears between 1973 and 2018 in Svalbard, Greenland, and Canada.

See also
 International Polar Bear Day
 World Wide Fund for Nature

References

External links
 

Animal charities based in Canada
Animal charities based in the United States
Animal welfare organizations based in the United States
Bear conservation
Charities based in Montana
International environmental organizations